Margaret Augusta Eliot (26 February 1914 – 27 February 2011) was an English music teacher and musician. She was a professor of oboe at the Guildhall School of Music and Drama, and her best-known student (from 1948) was George Martin; in 2011, just before her death at age 97, she appeared in the documentary film Produced by George Martin. In the early 1960s she also taught Paul McCartney successfully play the recorder, which he later used to effect, for the recording of, "The Fool on the Hill".

Eliot was also an honorary member of the Royal Academy of Music.

Family
Margaret Eliot was born to Hon. Edward Granville Eliot (1878–1958) - a younger brother of both 7th and 8th Earls of St Germans - and his wife Clare Louise née Phelips (1883–1927). She was a great granddaughter of Edward Granville Eliot, 3rd Earl of St Germans (1798–1877).

On 27 July 1943, she married Dr Richard Asher (1912–1969); the couple had three children:
Peter Asher (born 1944), who was one half of the pop duo Peter & Gordon and successful music producer;
Jane Asher (born 1946), the film and TV actress, novelist
Clare Asher (born 1948), the radio actress.

References

1914 births
2011 deaths
English classical oboists
Women oboists
Academics of the Guildhall School of Music and Drama
Honorary Members of the Royal Academy of Music
Margaret Eliot
20th-century classical musicians